Miyaluo (Mandarin: 米亚罗镇) is a town in Li County, Ngawa Tibetan and Qiang Autonomous Prefecture, Sichuan, China.

References 
 

 

 
Towns in Sichuan
Ngawa Tibetan and Qiang Autonomous Prefecture